Margarita Sergeevna Noskova (born 2002) is a Russian deaf snowboarder. She represented Russia at the 2019 Winter Deaflympics on her maiden Deaflympic appearance and claimed gold medals in women's big air and snowboard cross events.

References 

2002 births
Living people
Russian female snowboarders
Deaf sportspeople
Russian deaf people
Deaflympic gold medalists for Russia
Deaflympic silver medalists for Russia
Snowboarders at the 2019 Winter Deaflympics
Medalists at the 2019 Winter Deaflympics